Inuttitut, Inuttut, or Nunatsiavummiutitut is a dialect of Inuktitut. It is spoken across northern Labrador by Inuit, whose traditional lands are known as Nunatsiavut.

The language has a distinct writing system, created in Greenland in the 1760s by German missionaries from the Moravian Church. This separate writing tradition, the remoteness of Nunatsiavut from other Inuit communities, and its unique history of cultural contacts have made it into a distinct dialect with a separate literary tradition.

It shares features, including Schneider's Law, the reduction of alternate sequences of consonant clusters by simplification, with some Inuit dialects spoken in Quebec. It is differentiated by the tendency to neutralize velars and uvulars, i.e.  ~ , and  ~  in word final and pre-consonantal positions, as well as by the assimilation of consonants in clusters, compared to other dialects. Morphological systems (~juk/~vuk) and syntactic patterns (e.g. the ergative) have similarly diverged. Nor are the Labrador dialects uniform: there are separate variants traceable to a number of regions, e.g. Rigolet, Nain, Hebron, etc.

Although Nunatsiavut claims over 4,000 inhabitants of Inuit descent, only 550 reported any Inuit language to be their mother tongue in the 2001 census, mostly in the town of Nain. Inuttitut is seriously endangered.

Alphabet 
Nunatsiavut uses a Latin alphabet devised by German-speaking Moravian missionaries, which includes the letter ĸ (kra, often also written with an uppercase K). In 1980, the Labrador Inuit Standardized Writing System was developed during a meeting with elders and educators to provide consistency and clarity. The previous orthography used  to represent  before uvulars; however, the Labrador Inuttitut no longer has a distinct  at the end of syllables. In the new orthography,  represents .

The main difference with the Latin orthography used for other Inuktitut dialects are the following letters:
  â = aa
  e = ii
  o = uu
  ĸ = q
  ng, n̲g̲ or ngng = nng

Dialects 
At one time, there existed two dialects of the Inuttut language. The Inuit that reside south of the Davis Inlet in what is now known as Nunatuĸavut once spoke a divergent dialect known as "Nunatuĸavummiutut", indicated by differences in toponymy. However, due to heavy European immigration into Nunatuĸavut, this dialect has since become extinct.

The Nunatsiavummiut dialect has survived due to the isolation of the Inuit who reside north of the Davis inlet. There exist two sub-dialects of Inuttitut, the northern dialect (spoken mainly in Nain) and the southern dialect (spoken only by a few elders in Rigolet). They differ only in phonology.

Vocabulary comparison 
The comparison of some animal names in the two dialects of Inuktitut:

German loanwords 
The German loanwords used in Inuttitut date from the period of the German missionaries of Moravian Church (1760s).

ailvat (< Ger. elf) 'eleven'
ainsik (< Ger. eins) 'one o'clock'
fiarâ (< Ger. vier) 'four o'clock'
Fraitâg ( < Ger. Freitag) 'Friday'
kâttopalak (< Ger. Kartoffel) 'potato'
Metvog (< Ger. Mittwoch) 'Wednesday'
Montâg (< Ger. Montag) 'Monday'
naina (< Ger. neun) 'nine'
sâksit (< Ger. sechs) 'six'
senat (< Ger. zehn) 'ten'
sepat (< Ger. sieben) 'seven'
silipa (< Ger. Silber) 'coin'
situnati (< Ger. Stunde) 'hour'
Sontâg (< Ger. Sonntag) 'Sunday'
Sunâpint (< Ger. Sonnabend) 'Saturday'
suvai (< Ger. zwei) 'two'
suvailva (< Ger. zwölf) 'twelve'
tarai (< Ger. drei) 'three'
taraitijik (< Ger. dreißig) '30 odd 30 rifle and ammunition'
Tenistâg (< Ger. Dienstag) 'Tuesday'
Tonistâg (< Ger. Donnerstag) 'Thursday'
viaga (< Ger. vier) 'four'
vogik (< Ger. Woche) 'week'

References

Further reading

 Smith, L. R., and Sam Metcalfe. Labrador Inuttut – English Glossary. [St. John's]: Memorial University of Newfoundland, 1970.
 Smith, Lawrence .R. (1975) "Labrador Inuttut surface phonology". International journal of American linguistics 41 (2), 97-105.

Agglutinative languages
Inuit in Newfoundland and Labrador
Inuit languages
Indigenous languages of the North American Arctic
History of the Labrador Province of the Moravian Church
Inuktitut words and phrases
Endangered indigenous languages of the Americas